Sechellophryne is a small genus of sooglossid frogs with only two members living in the Seychelles.

Species
 Sechellophryne gardineri 
 Sechellophryne pipilodryas

References

 
Amphibian genera